Joshua Symonette (born May 8, 1978) is a former American football safety in the National Football League for the Washington Redskins.  While in Washington, Symonette made the team in 2000 as an undrafted rookie free agent. He was active for four games and recorded two special team tackles. After being released from the Redskins on September 2, 2001, he signed with the Miami Dolphins on January 15, 2002. In 2003, he played one season for the Berlin Thunder in the now defunct NFL Europe. He played college football at Tennessee Tech.

While at Tennessee Tech, Symonette was an All-Ohio Valley Conference selection each year of his career. As a freshman, he made three interceptions and earned an honorable mention selection in 1996. During his sophomore season, he was second on the team with 98 tackles and earned second-team All-OVC. During his final two seasons at Tech, Symonette recorded more than 200 tackles and two interceptions. He was a first-team All-OVC selection following both seasons. He also, holds the school record for the longest interception return, 98 yards. He was coached at Tennessee Tech by former Atlanta Falcons head coach Mike Smith.

He earned a Bachelor of Science in Interdisciplinary Studies with a concentration in English-Journalism.

He is currently a pastor at the National Community Church's Kingstowne, VA campus.

References

1978 births
Living people
Players of American football from Miami
American football safeties
Tennessee Tech Golden Eagles football players
Washington Redskins players
Berlin Thunder players